Dakota Reid Chalmers (born October 8, 1996) is an American professional baseball pitcher for the Gastonia Honey Hunters of the Atlantic League of Professional Baseball. He was drafted by the Oakland Athletics in the 3rd round of the 2015 Major League Baseball draft.

Career

Oakland Athletics
Chalmers attended Lakeview Academy in Gainesville, Georgia, for his first two years of high school before transferring to North Forsyth High School in Cumming, Georgia. The Oakland Athletics selected Chalmers in the third round of the 2015 MLB draft, and signed for a $1.2 million signing bonus. He signed with Oakland, forgoing his commitment to play college baseball at the University of Georgia.

After signing, Chalmers made his professional debut for the Arizona League Athletics where he posted a 0–1 record with a 2.66 ERA in 11 starts. He spent 2016 with the Vermont Lake Monsters, going 5–4 with a 4.70 ERA in 15 games (13 starts), and 2017 with the Beloit Snappers, pitching to a 2–2 record and a 4.34 ERA in ten games (five starts). He returned to Beloit to begin 2018, but only pitched in two games due to injury.

Minnesota Twins
On August 9, 2018, the Athletics traded Chalmers to the Minnesota Twins in exchange for Fernando Rodney. He did not pitch after being traded. In 2019, he began the year rehabbing before being assigned to the Fort Myers Miracle, with whom he started five games, pitching to a 1–1 record with a 3.38 ERA.

Chalmers was added to the Twins 40-man roster on November 20, 2019. Chalmers did not play in a game in 2020 due to the cancellation of the minor league season because of the COVID-19 pandemic. Chalmers was assigned to the Double-A Wichita Wind Surge, but struggled to a 9.49 ERA in 12.1 innings of work. On May 29, 2021, Chalmers was designated for assignment by the Twins.

Chicago Cubs
On June 5, 2021, Chalmers was claimed off waivers by the Chicago Cubs. On June 11, Chalmers was designated for assignment by the Cubs without appearing in a major or minor league game for the organization. He was outrighted to the Double-A Tennessee Smokies on June 13. Chalmers worked to a 5.37 ERA in 15 appearances (14 of them starts), and also appeared in 1 game for the Triple-A Iowa Cubs. He elected free agency following the season on November 7, 2021.

Los Angeles Dodgers
On March 16, 2022, Chalmers signed a minor league contract with the Los Angeles Dodgers. He allowed 13 runs in 13 innings in 13 games for the Oklahoma City Dodgers before he was released on July 27.

Gastonia Honey Hunters
On August 19, 2022, Chalmers signed with the Gastonia Honey Hunters of the Atlantic League of Professional Baseball.

References

External links

Living people
1996 births
Baseball pitchers
Minor league baseball players
Arizona League Athletics players
Vermont Lake Monsters players
Beloit Snappers players
Gulf Coast Twins players
Fort Myers Miracle players
Iowa Cubs players
Oklahoma City Dodgers players
Salt River Rafters players
Wichita Wind Surge players
Tennessee Smokies players